Peter James Marshall  (born 1933 in Calcutta) is a British historian known for his work on the British Empire, particularly the activities of British East India Company servants in 18th-century Bengal, and also the history of British involvement in North America during the same period. He is not to be confused with his contemporary, the other P. J. Marshall, who chronicled the history of public transport in the British Isles.

Early life and education
He was educated at Wellington College, Berkshire, and, following national service with the 7th (Kenya) Battalion, King's African Rifles, he took a first class honours degree in history at Wadham College, Oxford, from where he received a D.Phil. in 1962.

Academic career and professional activities
Between 1959 and 1993, he taught in the history department at King's College London. He was appointed Rhodes Professor of Imperial History in 1980, in which post he remained until his retirement.

Between 1965 and 1978, he served as a Member of the Editorial Committee for The Correspondence of Edmund Burke, and between 1975 and 1981 he was Editor of The Journal of Imperial and Commonwealth History. He sat on the History Working Group for National Curriculum in England in 1989 and 1990. In 1987 he was appointed Vice-President of the Royal Historical Society, serving as President between 1997 and 2001. He has been a notable benefactor to the Society.

He is an Emeritus Rhodes Professor of Imperial History at King's College London, where he continues to lecture.

British in India
Marshall presents a revisionist interpretation, rejecting the view that the prosperity of Mughal Bengal gave way to poverty and anarchy in the colonial period. He instead argues that the British takeover did not mark any sharp break with the past. After 1765, British control was delegated largely through regional rulers and was sustained by a generally prosperous economy for the rest of the 18th century. Marshall also notes that the British raised revenue through local tax administrators and kept the old Mughal rates of taxation. His interpretation of colonial Bengal, at least until c. 1820, is one in which the British were not in full control, but instead were actors in what was primarily an Indian play, and in which their ability to keep power depended upon excellent co-operation with Indian elites. Marshall admits that much of his interpretation is still contested by many historians.

Selected publications
The Impeachment of Warren Hastings, (Oxford, 1965)
The Correspondence of Edmund Burke, vol. V, (Cambridge, 1965) (Assistant Editor)
The Correspondence of Edmund Burke, vol. VII, (Cambridge, 1968) (Assistant Editor)
East Indian Fortunes: The British in Bengal in the Eighteenth Century, (Oxford, 1976)
The Correspondence of Edmund Burke, vol. X, (Cambridge, 1978) (Assistant Editor)
The Great Map of Mankind: British Perceptions of the World in the Age of Enlightenment, (London, 1982) (Co-editor with G. Williams)
The New Cambridge History of India, II, 2, Bengal: the British Bridgehead: Eastern India, 1740 – 1828, (Cambridge, 1988)
The Oxford History of the British Empire, vol. II, The Eighteenth Century, (Oxford, 1998) (Contributor & Editor)
A Free Though Conquering People': Eighteenth-century Britain and its Empire, (Aldershot, 2003)
The Making and Unmaking of Empires: Britain, India and America c. 1750 – 1783, (Oxford, 2005)

Awards
Doctor of Literature honoris causa by the School of Advanced Study at the University of London, December 2008 
Commander of the Order of the British Empire
Fellow of the British Academy

Legacy
A Junior Research Fellowship bearing his name, and jointly administered by the Royal Historical Society and the Institute of Historical Research at the University of London, where he is an honorary Fellow, is awarded annually to a doctoral student in history.

Bibliography
Marshall, P. J., East Indian Fortunes: The British in Bengal in the Eighteenth Century, (Oxford, 1976), pp. 284
Marshall, P. J.,The Making and Unmaking of Empires: Britain, India and America c. 1750 – 1783, (Oxford, 2005), pp. 398

References

External links
 
 
 

1933 births
Living people
Alumni of Wadham College, Oxford
Academics of King's College London
Commanders of the Order of the British Empire
Fellows of the British Academy
Fellows of the Royal Historical Society
Historians of South Asia
People educated at Wellington College, Berkshire
Writers from Kolkata
Presidents of the Royal Historical Society
Fellows of King's College London